We Got the Rhythm is the second studio album recorded by American funk band The People's Choice, released in 1976 on the TSOP label.

Chart performance
The album peaked at No. 38 on the R&B albums chart. It also reached No. 174 on the Billboard 200. The album features the single, "Here We Go Again", which peaked at No. 52 on the Hot Soul Singles chart. "Movin' in All Directions" also charted at No. 52 on the Hot Soul Singles chart.

Track listing

Personnel
People's Choice
Frankie Brunson – lead vocals, keyboards
David Thompson – percussion
Roger Andrews – bass
Guy Fiske – lead guitar
Darnell Jordan – rhythm guitar
Donald Ford – keyboards

Additional Musicians/Personnel
Leon Huff, John Whitehead, Gene McFadden, Phil Terry – background vocals on "Cold Blooded & Down-Right-Funky", "Jam, Jam, Jam (All Night Long)", "Here We Go Again", and "Movin' in All Direction"
Leon Huff – synthesizer on "Opus-de-Funk"
Sam Peake – saxophone on "Opus-de-Funk"
Victor Carstarphen – organ on "Opus-de-Funk"

References

External links
 

1976 albums
The People's Choice (band) albums
Albums produced by Kenneth Gamble
Albums produced by Leon Huff
Albums recorded at Sigma Sound Studios
TSOP Records albums